The discography of Canadian singer and songwriter the Weeknd consists of five studio albums, three mixtapes, three extended plays, three compilation albums (including two greatest hits albums), one live album, sixty-seven singles (including twenty-one as a featured artist), and six promotional singles (including one as a featured artist). According to the Recording Industry Association of America (RIAA), The Weeknd has accumulated 12.5 million certified album units and 83 million certified digital single units in the US, based on sales and on-demand streaming as of February 2021.

The Weeknd released three mixtapes in 2011: House of Balloons, Thursday and Echoes of Silence, the first of which was certified silver in the UK. He signed with Republic Records in 2012, and released Trilogy, a compilation album of the three mixtapes he had released the previous year. Trilogy peaked within the top five on albums charts and was certified multi-platinum in Canada and the US. The album spawned three singles, all of which were certified platinum or more in the US: "Wicked Games", "Twenty Eight", and "The Zone" featuring Drake. His debut studio album, Kiss Land, reached number two on the albums charts of Canada and the US.

In 2014, the Weeknd recorded the duet single "Love Me Harder" with singer, songwriter Ariana Grande for her album My Everything, and the single "Earned It" for the Fifty Shades of Grey soundtrack. Both singles were top-ten entries on both the singles charts of Canada and the US. His second studio album, Beauty Behind the Madness,  released in 2015, reached number one of the albums charts of Australia, Canada, Sweden, the UK, and the US respectively. Supported by the US Billboard Hot 100 number-one singles "The Hills" and "Can't Feel My Face", the album has sold over one million copies in the US and 3.6 million copies worldwide as of 2017. "The Hills" has been certified 11× Platinum in the US.

The Weeknd's third studio album, Starboy, was released in 2016, and peaked atop the charts in Australia, Canada, Denmark, New Zealand, and the US. It was supported by the international top-ten singles "Starboy" and "I Feel It Coming", both of which feature the duo Daft Punk, and peaked atop the singles chart and has received diamond certifications in France. "Starboy" and "I Feel It Coming" also received multi-platinum certifications in Australia, Canada, Sweden, and the US. In 2018, the Weeknd released an EP titled My Dear Melancholy, which spawned the Canada number-one single "Call Out My Name". He recorded the Canada and US multi-platinum single "Pray for Me" with American rapper Kendrick Lamar for the Black Panther soundtrack.

On March 20, 2020, the Weeknd released his fourth studio album, After Hours. The hit single, "Blinding Lights", broke the record for the most weeks in the top five (43), top ten (57), and top 100 (90) of the Billboard Hot 100 at the time of its release, and finished 2020 as the year's top Billboard Hot 100 song.  The song was later ranked as the No. 1 Greatest Hot 100 Hit of All Time by Billboard. After Hours peaked atop the albums charts of multiple countries including Australia, Canada, the Netherlands, Sweden, the UK, and the US, and also spawned the US number-one and Canada top-ten singles "Heartless" and "Save Your Tears".

On January 7, 2022, the Weeknd released his fifth studio album, Dawn FM. The lead single, "Take My Breath", which was released on August 6, 2021, debuted and peaked at number six of the Billboard Hot 100 in the US. Other singles, achieving moderate success of their own from the album include "Sacrifice", "Out of Time" and "Less than Zero". Later in the year, the Weeknd released a collaboration with Metro Boomin and 21 Savage, "Creepin'", which reached number three on the Hot 100 the following year.

Albums

Studio albums

Live albums

Mixtapes

Compilation albums

Soundtrack albums

Extended plays

Singles

As lead artist

As featured artist

Promotional singles

Other charted songs

Guest appearances

Songwriting credits

Production discography

2011
The Weeknd – House of Balloons
1. "High for This" 
2. "What You Need" 
3. "House of Balloons / Glass Table Girls" 
4. "The Morning" 
5. "Wicked Games" 
6. "The Party & the After Party" 
7. "Coming Down" 
8. "Loft Music" 
9. "The Knowing" 

The Weeknd – Thursday
1. "Lonely Star" 
2. "Life of the Party" 
3. "Thursday" 
4. "The Zone" (featuring Drake) 
5. "The Birds, Pt. 1" 
6. "The Birds, Pt. 2" 
7. "Gone" 
8. "Rolling Stone" 
9. "Heaven or Las Vegas" 

The Weeknd – Echoes of Silence
1. "D.D." 
2. "Montreal" 
3. "Outside" 
4. "XO / The Host" 
5. "Initiation" 
6. "Same Old Song" (featuring Juicy J) 
7. "The Fall" 
8. "Next" 
9. "Echoes of Silence" 

Drake – Take Care
4. "Crew Love" (featuring the Weeknd) 
18. "The Ride" 

Lady Gaga – Born This Way: The Remix
5. "Marry The Night" (Remix) 

Florence and the Machine – Shake it Out (Remixes)
2. "Shake it Out" (Remix)

2012
The Weeknd – Trilogy
10. (Volume 1) "Twenty Eight" 
10. (Volume 2) "Valerie" 
10. (Volume 3) "Till Dawn (Here Comes the Sun)"

2013
Juicy J – Stay Trippy 
19. "One of Those Nights" (featuring the Weeknd) 

The Weeknd – Kiss Land
1. "Professional" 
2. "The Town" 
3. "Adaptation" 
4. "Love in the Sky" 
5. "Belong to the World" 
6. "Live For" (featuring Drake) 
7. "Wanderlust" 
8. "Kiss Land" 
9. "Pretty" 
10. "Tears in the Rain"

2014
Rick Ross – Mastermind
13. "In Vein" (featuring the Weeknd) 

The Weeknd
 "King of the Fall"

2015
The Weeknd – Beauty Behind the Madness
1. "Real Life" 
2. "Losers" (featuring Labrinth) 
3. "Tell Your Friends" 
4. "Often" 
6. "Acquainted" 
8. "Shameless" 
10. "In the Night" 
11. "As You Are" 
13. "Prisoner" (featuring Lana Del Rey) 
14. "Angel" 

Travis Scott – Rodeo
6. "Pray 4 Love" (featuring the Weeknd)

2016
Future – Evol
10. "Low Life" (featuring the Weeknd) 

The Weeknd – Starboy
1. "Starboy" (featuring Daft Punk) 
2. "Party Monster" 
3. "False Alarm" 
5. "Rockin'" 
6. "Secrets" 
7. "True Colors" 
10. "Six Feet Under" 
11. "Love to Lay" 
13. "Attention" 
15. "Nothing Without You" 
16. "All I Know" (featuring Future) 
17. "Die for You" 
18. "I Feel It Coming" (featuring Daft Punk)

2017
Lil Uzi Vert – Luv Is Rage 2
10. "UnFazed" (featuring the Weeknd)

2019
Gesaffelstein – Hyperion
3. "Lost in the Fire" (with the Weeknd) 

Various Artists – For the Throne: Music Inspired by the HBO Series Game of Thrones
2. "Power Is Power" (performed by SZA, the Weeknd, and Travis Scott)

2020
The Weeknd – After Hours
1. "Alone Again" 
2. "Too Late" 
3. "Hardest to Love" 
4. "Scared to Live" 
5. "Snowchild" 
6. "Escape from LA" 
7. "Heartless" 
8. "Faith" 
9. "Blinding Lights" 
10. "In Your Eyes" 
11. "Save Your Tears" 
13. "After Hours" 
14. "Until I Bleed Out" 

Deluxe bonus tracks
15. "Nothing Compares" 
16. "Missed You" 
17. "Final Lullaby" 

Calvin Harris and the Weeknd 
 "Over Now"

2021
Belly – See You Next Wednesday.

10. "Two Tone" (featuring Lil Uzi Vert) 

Rosalía – Motomami
 3. "La Fama" (featuring the Weeknd)

2022
The Weeknd – Dawn FM
1. "Dawn FM" 
2. "Gasoline" 
3. "How Do I Make You Love Me?" 
4. "Take My Breath" 
5. "Sacrifice" 
6. "A Tale by Quincy" 
7. "Out of Time" 
8. "Here We Go... Again" (featuring Tyler, the Creator) 
9. "Best Friends" 
10. "Is There Someone Else?" 
11. "Starry Eyes" 
12. "Every Angel Is Terrifying" 
13. "Don't Break My Heart" 
14. "I Heard You're Married" (featuring Lil Wayne) 
15. "Less than Zero" 
16. "Phantom Regret by Jim"

Notes

References

External links
 
 The Weeknd at AllMusic

Discographies of Canadian artists
Rhythm and blues discographies
Discography
Pop music discographies